Duis is a surname. Notable people with this surname include:

 Robert Duis (1913–1991), German basketball player
 Thomas Duis (born 1958), German pianist

See also
 Dui (vessel), a type of ritual bronze vessel
 Luis